Willie Moseley (born April 5, 1990) is an American football linebacker who is currently a free agent.

College career
Moseley played high school football at Varina High School in Richmond, VA. He played college football at Buffalo.

Professional career

Tampa Bay Buccaneers
On April 29, 2013, Moseley was signed as an undrafted free agent by the Tampa Bay Buccaneers. He was waived from the team on May 17.

Winnipeg Blue Bombers
Moseley had worked out for the Toronto Argonauts of the Canadian Football League. Was signed by the Winnipeg Blue Bombers of the Canadian Football League prior to the 2014 training camp.  Was released prior to the 2014 CFL season but re-signed to the practice roster of the Blue Bombers. He was released by the Winnipeg Blue Bombers on October 17, 2014.

References

External links
Tampa Bay Buccaneers bio
Buffalo Bulls bio

1990 births
Living people
American football linebackers
Canadian football linebackers
African-American players of American football
African-American players of Canadian football
Buffalo Bulls football players
Winnipeg Blue Bombers players
Players of American football from Richmond, Virginia
Sportspeople from Richmond, Virginia
21st-century African-American sportspeople
Players of Canadian football from Virginia